Francesco Moser ( or ; ; born 19 June 1951), nicknamed "Lo sceriffo" (The sheriff), is an Italian former professional road bicycle racer. He finished on the podium of the Giro d'Italia six times including his win in the 1984 edition.

Moser was dominant from the mid-1970s to the early 1980s.  He turned professional in 1973, showing a cultured pedaling style. But his powerful build meant he was not a gifted climber. He entered one edition of the Tour de France, in 1975, where he won two stages, held the maillot jaune for six days and finished 7th overall. He also won the 1977 world road racing championship in addition to collecting silver medals in 1976 and 1978. He won six times in three of the five monuments. Three editions of Paris–Roubaix, two victories in the Giro di Lombardia and one win in Milan–San Remo.

His 273 road victories puts him behind Eddy Merckx (525) and Rik Van Looy (379), but ahead of Rik Van Steenbergen (270) and Roger De Vlaeminck (255). He was also an accomplished track rider, riding up to six Six-Day races almost each winter throughout his career. He rode 35, 14 of which with René Pijnen, winning 15.

A nephew, Moreno Moser, (born 25 December 1990) is an Italian professional racer, and Francesco's son Ignazio Moser enjoyed success at the junior and amateur levels before retiring at the age of 22.

Palmarès

Classic races
After finishing second in 1974 behind Roger De Vlaeminck and in 1976 behind Marc Demeyer of Belgium, Moser finally won Paris–Roubaix, his favorite race, three consecutive times. Moser had seven podium finishes in Paris–Roubaix; only De Vlaeminck, with nine, has more. In 1978, he beat De Vlaeminck and Jan Raas of the Netherlands; in 1979, he beat De Vlaeminck and Hennie Kuiper of the Netherlands; and in 1980, he beat Gilbert Duclos-Lassalle of France and the German, Dietrich Thurau. Moser came in third in 1981 behind Bernard Hinault and Roger De Vlaeminck, and was also third in 1983 behind Hennie Kuiper and Gilbert Duclos-Lassalle. He rode Paris–Roubaix in his final season as a cyclist in 1987. Other victories include the 1975 and 1978 Giro di Lombardia and the 1984 Milan–San Remo.

Other classics
Moser won the 1974 Paris–Tours, the 1977 Züri-Metzgete, the 1979 Gent–Wevelgem, and the 1977 Flèche Wallonne.

Grand Tours
Moser had some success in the three-week grand tours. He rode the Tour de France in 1975, and although he won two stages, led the race for seven days and won the young rider competition, he never rode the Tour again;  the mountains did not suit him. However, he won the 1984 Giro d'Italia, in front of Laurent Fignon of France and Moreno Argentin of Italy. Taking advantage of an unusually flat course, Moser used time-trialing ability to overcome what others had gained in the mountains. He also won the points classification in the Giro d'Italia in 1976, 1977, 1978 and 1982.

Other accomplishments
He competed in the individual road race and team time trial events at the 1972 Summer Olympics.

Moser won the 1977 world road racing championship in San Cristobal, Venezuela, in front of Thurau and Franco Bitossi. Moser was also silver medallist in 1976, behind Freddy Maertens of Belgium and second in 1978 to Gerrie Knetemann of the Netherlands.

On 19 January 1984, in Mexico City, Moser broke the 1972 hour record of Eddy Merckx.  He rode 50.808 kilometers, on an aerodynamic bike with full disc wheels more advanced than the conventional bike Merckx used in 1972.  As a result, in 1997 the Union Cycliste Internationale banned hour records set on bikes featuring technological advantages. Under the new rules, Merckx's record wasn't broken until 2000.  Moser auctioned his bicycle to benefit UNICEF.

He was a member of the Regional Council of Trentino-Alto Adige from 1993 until 1998.

Rivalries
Moser's biggest rival was Giuseppe Saronni.

After retirement
Moser started a bike company, Moser Cicli, constructing race bikes in a workshop in Trento. Production is 2,000-3,000 frames annually.

He was the first chairman of the CPA (Cyclistes Professionels Associés), a union for professional riders of TT/I and TT/II league of teams (now UCI WorldTeams and UCI Professional Continental Teams, respectively). He held the position from 1999 until 2007.

Moser also became a viticulturist, cultivating different varieties of grapes. He continued his father's winery with his children Francesca, Carlo and Ignazio on the family estate Maso Villa Warth in Val di Cembra, on the hills just north of Trento. He is also a passionate hunter and was the host of the television series "A Caccia con Moser" (Hunting with Moser) on Sky Italia's channel Caccia TV.

Major results

1971
 1st  Overall Giro Ciclistico d'Italia
1st Stages 1a & 6
 4th Trofeo Alcide Degasperi
1972
 3rd Gran Premio della Liberazione
 8th Road race, Olympic Games
1973
 1st Stage 14 Giro d'Italia
 3rd Giro della Provincia di Reggio Calabria
 5th Overall Giro di Puglia
 7th Trofeo Laigueglia
 9th Overall Tirreno–Adriatico
 9th La Flèche Wallonne
 9th Milano–Torino
1974
 1st Paris–Tours
 1st Coppa Bernocchi
 1st Giro del Piemonte
 1st Giro dell'Emilia
 1st Giro della Provincia di Reggio Calabria
 1st Giro Di Toscana
 1st Giro dell'Umbria
 1st Trofeo Baracchi (with Roy Schuiten)
 2nd Paris–Roubaix
 2nd Coppa Placci
 2nd Gran Premio di Lugano
 2nd Trofeo Matteotti
 2nd Gran Premio de Valencia
 4th Giro della Romagna
 5th Overall Tirreno–Adriatico
 5th Grand Prix des Nations
 5th Gran Premio Industria e Commercio di Prato
 6th Road race, National Road Championships
 7th Road race, UCI Road World Championships
 7th Overall Giro d'Italia
 7th Giro di Lombardia
 8th Overall Volta a la Comunitat Valenciana
 10th Paris–Brussels
1975
 1st  Road race, National Road Championships
 1st  Overall Grand Prix du Midi Libre
1st Stages 3 & 4a
 1st Giro di Lombardia
 1st Trofeo Matteotti
 1st Gran Premio Città di Camaiore
 1st Coppa Placci
 1st Giro dell'Umbria
 1st Grand Prix de Monaco
 1st Trofeo Baracchi (with Gianbattista Baronchelli)
 2nd Overall Critérium du Dauphiné Libéré
1st Prologue (TTT)
 2nd Milan–San Remo
 2nd Trofeo Pantalica
 2nd Gran Premio di Lugano
 2nd Giro della Provincia di Reggio Calabria
 3rd Züri-Metzgete
 4th Overall Tirreno–Adriatico
 4th Overall Giro di Puglia
 4th Giro dell'Emilia
 5th Paris–Roubaix
 5th Milano–Torino
 5th Giro Di Toscana
 6th Giro del Veneto
 6th Coppa Sabatini
 6th Critérium des As
 7th Overall Tour de France
1st  Young rider classification
1st Prologue & Stage 7
Held  after Prologue–Stage 5
Held  after Prologue & Stage 1b
 8th Overall À travers Lausanne
 8th Gent–Wevelgem
 9th Coppa Ugo Agostoni
 10th Coppa Bernocchi
1976
 1st  Individual pursuit, UCI Track World Championships
 1st  Overall Giro di Puglia
1st Stage 2
 1st Giro dell'Appennino
 1st Giro Di Toscana
 1st Trofeo Pantalica
 1st Trofeo Matteotti
 1st Tre Valli Varesine
 2nd  Road race, UCI Road World Championships
 2nd Road race, National Road Championships
 2nd Paris–Roubaix
 2nd Tour of Flanders
 2nd Coppa Bernocchi
 2nd Coppa Placci
 2nd Trofeo Baracchi (with Roy Schuiten)
 3rd Coppa Ugo Agostoni
 3rd Giro del Friuli
 4th Overall Giro d'Italia
1st  Points classification
1st Stages 4, 7 (ITT) & 14
Held  after Stage 7 
 4th Overall Tirreno–Adriatico
 4th Züri-Metzgete
 6th Giro di Lombardia
 6th Giro dell'Umbria
 6th Giro di Campania
 6th Milano–Vignola
 7th Gent–Wevelgem
 8th Gran Premio Industria e Commercio di Prato
 9th Milan–San Remo
 9th Giro dell'Emilia
1977
 1st  Road race, UCI Road World Championships
 1st La Flèche Wallonne
 1st Züri-Metzgete
 1st Châteauroux Classic
 1st Grand Prix Le Télégramme
 1st Critérium des As
 1st Coppa Ugo Agostoni
 1st Giro del Lazio
 1st Giro Di Toscana
 1st Giro dell'Umbria
 1st Stage 4 Tour de l'Aude
 2nd Overall Giro d'Italia
1st  Points classification
Held  after Stages 5–16b
 3rd Road race, National Road Championships
 3rd Giro di Campania
 4th Overall Giro di Puglia
 4th Tour of Flanders
 4th Giro del Veneto
 5th Milano–Torino
 5th Coppa Bernocchi
 5th Trofeo Pantalica
 5th Gran Premio Industria e Commercio di Prato
 5th Giro della Provincia di Reggio Calabria
 6th Trofeo Matteotti
 6th Coppa Placci
 6th Gran Premio Città di Camaiore
 7th Amstel Gold Race
 7th Giro dell'Emilia
 9th Tre Valli Varesine
1978
 1st  Overall Volta a Catalunya
1st  Points classification
1st Prologue, Stages 1, 3b & 7b (ITT)
 1st  Overall Tour de l'Aude
1st Prologue, Stages 1 & 3 
 1st Paris–Roubaix
 1st Giro di Lombardia
 1st Tre Valli Varesine
 1st GP Industria & Artigianato di Larciano
 1st Giro del Lazio
 1st Coppa Sabatini
 1st Trofeo Matteotti
 1st Stage 2 Giro di Sardegna
 2nd  Road race, UCI Road World Championships
 2nd Road race, National Road Championships
 2nd Overall Giro di Puglia
 2nd Amstel Gold Race
 2nd Züri-Metzgete
 2nd Gran Premio di Lugano
 2nd Grand Prix des Nations
 3rd Overall Giro d'Italia
1st  Points classification
1st Stages 11b, 13, 14 (ITT) & 16 (ITT)
 3rd Overall Tirreno–Adriatico
 3rd Liège–Bastogne–Liège
 3rd Gent–Wevelgem
 3rd Trofeo Laigueglia
 3rd Grand Prix of Aargau Canton
 4th Rund um den Henninger Turm
 6th Milan–San Remo
 7th Tour of Flanders
 8th Giro della Romagna
 8th Critérium des As
 9th Overall Grand Prix du Midi Libre
1st Prologue & Stage 3
1979
 1st  Road race, National Road Championships
 1st  Overall Ruota d'Oro
1st Stages 2 & 3 (ITT)
 1st  Overall Tour de l'Aude
1st Prologue
 1st Paris–Roubaix
 1st Gent–Wevelgem
 1st Giro dell'Emilia
 1st Giro del Friuli
 1st Giro del Veneto
 1st Trofeo Baracchi (with Giuseppe Saronni)
 2nd  Individual pursuit, UCI Track World Championships
 2nd Overall Giro d'Italia
1st Prologue, Stages 3 (ITT) & 17
Held  after Prologue–Stage 7
Held  after Prologue, Stages 2–5, 15 & 17–18
 2nd Overall Giro del Trentino
 2nd Grand Prix des Nations
 2nd Züri-Metzgete
 2nd GP Industria & Artigianato di Larciano
 2nd Coppa Ugo Agostoni
 3rd Overall Deutschland Tour
 3rd Trofeo Laigueglia
 3rd Coppa Bernocchi
 3rd Giro di Campania
 4th Milan–San Remo
 4th Giro del Lazio
 5th Overall Tirreno–Adriatico
1st Prologue
 5th Tre Valli Varesine
 6th Trofeo Pantalica
1980
 1st  Overall Tirreno–Adriatico
1st Prologue
 1st  Overall Giro del Trentino
1st Prologue & Stage 1
 1st Paris–Roubaix
 1st Nice–Alassio
 Giro d'Italia
1st Prologue
Held  after Prologue–Stage 4
Held  after Prologue–Stage 1
 2nd Tour of Flanders
 2nd Rund um den Henninger Turm
 2nd Milano–Torino
 2nd Trofeo Pantalica
 2nd Milano–Vignola
 3rd Overall Tour of Belgium
 3rd Trofeo Laigueglia
 3rd Coppa Sabatini
 3rd Grand Prix des Nations
 5th Coppa Ugo Agostoni
 6th Milan–San Remo
 6th Coppa Placci
 7th Giro dell'Emilia
 7th Giro del Lazio
 8th Trofeo Matteotti
1981
 1st  Road race, National Road Championships
 1st  Overall Tirreno–Adriatico
1st Prologue
 1st  Overall Giro di Frasassi
1st Stage 2
 1st Coppa Ugo Agostoni
 1st Giro dell'Umbria
 Giro d'Italia
1st Stage 14
Held  after Stage 1b & Stages 3–5
 2nd Overall Giro del Trentino
 2nd Overall Ruota d'Oro
 2nd Giro dell'Emilia
 2nd Giro della Romagna
 2nd Grand Prix Le Télégramme
 2nd Milano–Vignola
 2nd Trofeo Baracchi (with Knut Knudsen)
 3rd Paris–Roubaix
 3rd Coppa Bernocchi
 3rd Giro Di Toscana
 3rd Giro di Campania
 3rd Giro dell'Etna
 4th Rund um den Henninger Turm
 4th Giro del Friuli
 6th Road race, UCI Road World Championships
 7th Giro del Lazio
 8th Overall Tour de l'Aude
 8th Coppa Placci
1982
 1st  Overall Tour Midi-Pyrénées
1st Prologue
 1st Giro Di Toscana
 1st Giro di Campania
 1st Grand Prix Le Télégramme
 2nd Overall Grand Prix du Midi Libre
1st Stage 1
 2nd Overall Giro del Trentino
 2nd Coppa Ugo Agostoni
 3rd Overall Tour of the Basque Country
 3rd Giro di Lombardia
 3rd Coppa Sabatini
 4th Overall Tirreno–Adriatico
 4th Milan–San Remo
 4th GP Industria & Artigianato di Larciano
 6th Overall Giro di Sardegna
 6th Overall Tour de l'Aude
 7th Milano–Torino
 7th Giro del Friuli
 8th Overall Giro d'Italia
1st  Points classification
1st Stages 7 & 20
Held  after Stages 7–11
 9th Overall Ruota d'Oro
 9th Coppa Bernocchi
 10th Paris–Roubaix
1983
 1st  Overall Giro del Trentino
1st Prologue
 1st  Overall Tour of Norway
1st Stage 1
 1st Milano–Torino
 1st Milano–Vignola
 1st Giro del Friuli
 1st Giro di Campania
 1st Trofeo Pantalica
 1st Giro dell'Umbria
 2nd Giro del Lazio
 3rd Overall Tirreno–Adriatico
 3rd Paris–Roubaix
 3rd Giro del Piemonte
 3rd Giro della Provincia di Reggio Calabria
 4th Giro del Veneto
 4th Trofeo Matteotti
 5th Giro di Lombardia
 5th Critérium des As
 10th Giro dell'Emilia
 10th Gran Premio Città di Camaiore
1984
 1st  Overall Giro d'Italia
1st Prologue, Stages 6, 15 (ITT) & 22 (ITT)
 1st Milan–San Remo
 1st Giro del Lazio
 1st Giro dell'Etna
 1st Trofeo Baracchi (with Bernard Hinault)
 2nd Gran Premio Città di Camaiore
 5th Trofeo Pantalica
 6th Grand Prix Le Télégramme
 8th Critérium des As
 10th Overall Vuelta a España
1st Prologue & Stage 11
Held  after Prologue–Stage 5
Held  after Prologue 
1985
 1st Giro dell'Appennino
 1st Giro dell'Etna
 1st Trofeo Baracchi (with Hans-Henrik Ørsted)
 1st Stage 1 Ruota d'Oro
 2nd Overall Giro d'Italia
1st Prologue, Stages 19 & 22 (ITT)
Held  after Prologue–Stage 1
 2nd Giro del Friuli
 4th Giro di Campania
 5th Overall Giro del Trentino
 5th Giro dell'Emilia
 5th Giro dell'Umbria
1986
 1st Giro dell'Etna
 2nd Overall Tirreno–Adriatico
1st Prologue & Stage 6 (ITT)
 2nd Giro dell'Appennino
 2nd Giro della Provincia di Reggio Calabria
 3rd Overall Giro d'Italia
1st Stage 18 (ITT)
 3rd Trofeo Pantalica
 4th Overall Settimana Internazionale di Coppi e Bartali
1st Stage 4
 5th Giro di Campania
 6th Overall Giro di Puglia
 6th Tre Valli Varesine
 6th GP Industria & Artigianato di Larciano
 7th Amstel Gold Race
 7th Coppa Ugo Agostoni
 8th Paris–Roubaix
 9th Rund um den Henninger Turm
1987
 3rd Overall Tour Méditerranéen
1st Prologue
 4th Overall Giro del Trentino
1st Prologue
 4th Firenze–Pistoia
 5th Overall Tirreno–Adriatico
 5th Milano–Vignola
 9th Gran Premio Industria e Commercio di Prato
 9th Trofeo Matteotti
 10th Road race, National Road Championships
 10th Trofeo Pantalica

General classification results timeline

Classics results timeline

See also
 Legends of Italian sport – Walk of Fame
 Hour record
 Italy at the UCI Road World Championships
 List of doping cases in cycling
 List of Giro d'Italia classification winners
 List of Giro d'Italia general classification winners
 List of Grand Tour general classification winners
 Moser Cicli
 Pink jersey statistics

References

External links

Francesco Moser and his latest son Ignazio are among the characters of the cycling film "The Last Kilometer" 

1951 births
Living people
People from Giovo
Italian male cyclists
Giro d'Italia winners
UCI Road World Champions (elite men)
Italian Giro d'Italia stage winners
Cyclists at the 1972 Summer Olympics
Olympic cyclists of Italy
Tour de France prologue winners
Doping cases in cycling
Italian Tour de France stage winners
Sportspeople from Trentino
UCI Track Cycling World Champions (men)
Italian track cyclists
Members of the Regional Council of Trentino-Alto Adige
Super Prestige Pernod winners
Italian cycle designers
Cyclists from Trentino-Alto Adige/Südtirol